Eight ships of the Royal Navy have borne the name HMS Bellona after Bellona, the goddess of war in Roman mythology:

  was a 30-gun sixth rate, formerly the French privateer Bellone. She was captured in 1747, and sold in 1749.
  was a 74-gun third rate, launched in 1760 and broken up in 1814.
 Bellona, possibly a hired armed vessel or armed ship, was lost at the mouth of the Elbe circa December 1779. She had been escorting a convoy from Hull to Hamburg. Several of the merchantmen in the convoy were lost too.
  was a 3-gun vessel purchased in 1794. She was used as a mud boat from 1799 and was broken up in 1805.
  was a 28-gun sixth rate, formerly the French privateer . She was captured in 1806, renamed HMS Blanche in 1809, and was broken up in 1814.
She was renamed HMS Bellona in 1818, used for harbour service from 1840 and was broken up in 1868.
  was a third-class cruiser launched in 1890 and sold in 1906.
  was a  scout cruiser launched in 1909 and sold in 1921.
  was a modified Dido-class light cruiser launched in 1942, on loan to the Royal New Zealand Navy from 1948 to 1956, and broken up in 1959.

See also
 , several merchant vessels by that name

Citations

References
 

Royal Navy ship names